"U Talkin' to Me" is a song by Australian dance music duo Disco Montego. It was released on 2 December 2002 as the fourth and final single from their second studio album, Disco Montego (2002). "U Talkin' to Me" peaked at number 17 on the Australian ARIA Singles Chart. The song won an Australasian Performing Right Association (APRA) Award for Most Performed Dance Work during 2003 at the APRA Awards of 2004.

Track listing
Australian CD single
 "U Talkin' to Me"	– 3:46
 "U Talkin' to Me" (JP's Cheap Talkin' mix) – 5:00
 "U Talkin' to Me" (Mark John vs On the 1 & 2's Quazimodo 12-inch ride) – 6:00
 "U Talkin' to Me" (accapella) – 3:46

Charts

Weekly charts

Year-end charts

References

2002 singles
2002 songs
APRA Award winners
Disco Montego songs